Kandy Tamer is a former Lebanon international rugby league footballer who represented Lebanon at the 2000 World Cup, playing in three matches.

Background
Tamer was born in Tripoli, Lebanon

Playing career
Tamer played one match for the Eastern Suburbs Roosters in the 1994 NSWRL Premiership.

References

Living people
Australian rugby league players
Lebanon national rugby league team players
Rugby league second-rows
Sydney Roosters players
Year of birth missing (living people)
Place of birth missing (living people)